The Carnivorous Plant Newsletter is the official publication of the International Carnivorous Plant Society (ICPS), the largest such organization in the world. It is headquartered in Walnut Creek, California.

History and editorship

The newsletter has been published every year since its inception in 1972. It was first published as a stenciled  product, with annual subscription priced at $1 for those in the contiguous United States, Mexico and Canada, and $2 for those living elsewhere. The first issue, from April 1972, opened with the following paragraph:

In 1972 the newsletter had around 25 subscribers; this number quickly grew to more than 100 by June 29 of that year and reached 600 in July 1976. In 2018, the quarterly print run is 1400 copies.

The newsletter began printing in a 6 by 9-inch format with color covers and limited color reproduction in some articles in volume 7 (1978). The publication was founded by Don Schnell and Joe Mazrimas. Additional early editors included Leo Song and Larry Mellichamp. In 1997, Don Schnell retired and the new editors Jan Schlauer and Barry Rice joined the editorial staff. Mazrimas left the editorial board in 1998, leaving the journal's production to Schlauer, Rice, and Steve Baker (for page layout). In 2010, Bob Ziemer became managing editor with assistance from Barry Rice, Jan Schlauer,  Fernando Rivadavia, John Brittnacher, and Karl Herold.

Since December 2006, all back issues of the Carnivorous Plant Newsletter are available as PDFs from the website of the International Carnivorous Plant Society. Articles older than 1 year are open to non-members.

Format
The newsletter publishes on a quarterly basis, in full colour, and totals around 130 pages annually. Articles of scientific interest must pass through an anonymous peer-review process before being published. Typical articles also include matters of horticultural interest, field reports, literature reviews, synopses of new literature, and new taxa or cultivar descriptions. The newsletter has been a registration authority for cultivars of carnivorous plants since 1979, and in 1998, was appointed by the International Society for Horticultural Science as the International Cultivar Registration Authority for new carnivorous plant cultivars.

Review
In a 1990 review published in the journal Taxon, Rudolf Schmid generally praised the publication, saying "over the past decade [it] has developed into one of the most attractive newsletters available, so appealing, in fact, that many libraries put the journal under lock". He also noted, however, that the lack of a contents page and the tendency to run articles over several discontinuous pages were "annoying". These deficiencies were rapidly corrected by the CPN editors.

Taxon descriptions

The Carnivorous Plant Newsletter has published formal descriptions of the following taxa.

Drosera
Drosera camporupestris
Drosera grantsaui
Drosera hartmeyerorum
Drosera schwackei (new combination)
Drosera spatulata var. bakoensis
Drosera spatulata var. gympiensis
Drosera tentaculata
Drosera viridis
Drosera × corinthiaca
Drosera × fontinalis

Heliamphora
Heliamphora chimantensis
Heliamphora elongata
Heliamphora exappendiculata
Heliamphora folliculata
Heliamphora hispida
Heliamphora sarracenioides

Nepenthes
Nepenthes angasanensis
Nepenthes carunculata var. robusta
Nepenthes lavicola
Nepenthes longifolia
Nepenthes mikei
Nepenthes nebularum
Nepenthes ovata
Nepenthes rowaniae (emended description)
Nepenthes sibuyanensis
Nepenthes talangensis
Nepenthes tenuis
Nepenthes xiphioides

Pinguicula
Pinguicula lithophytica
Pinguicula nivalis
Pinguicula pilosa

Sarracenia
Sarracenia × bellii
Sarracenia × casei
Sarracenia × charlesmoorei
Sarracenia flava var. cuprea
Sarracenia flava var. rubricorpora
Sarracenia × naczii
Sarracenia purpurea subsp. venosa var. burkii f. luteola

Cultivars
The newsletter has also published a number of cultivar names.

References

Further reading

External links 
 

Magazines established in 1972
Quarterly magazines published in the United States
Science and technology magazines published in the United States
Carnivorous plant magazines
Magazines published in California
Newsletters